Kireçocağı can refer to:

 Kireçocağı, Çorum
 Kireçocağı, Seyhan